Secret Files and Origins (abbreviated SF&O) is a series of one-shot comic books and miniseries produced by DC Comics during the late 1990s and 2000s.

Publication history
The books are a combination of origin stories (similar to the earlier Secret Origins series produced by DC), profile pages (like DC's Who's Who series from the 1980s), and short stories which sometimes serve as prologues to upcoming DC Comics storylines. Many early issues also featured timelines of significant events in the characters' histories, but this stopped after the release of Guide to the DC Universe 2000 Secret Files and Origins #1 (with the exception of the two Vertigo Secret Files and Origins issues). Some of these one-shots are released to coincide with a new series (such as the first JSA issue), or with a special event (such as the Infinite Crisis issue). Originally the books featured sequential numbering, but from 2003-2006 this was dropped in favor of putting the year of publication in the title (so for example, Aquaman Secret Files and Origins 2003 is the equivalent of Aquaman Secret Files and Origins #2); sequential numbering returned with the release of Green Lantern/Sinestro Corps: Secret Files and Origins #1 in 2007.

Bibliography of Secret Files and Origins issues

Notes

References

DC Comics titles